The law of Hungary is civil law. It was first codified during the socialist period.

Constitution

The constitution of 2011 replaced that of 1949.

Legislation

The legislature is the Magyar Országgyűlés (English: National Assembly). There was formerly a Diet of Hungary.

Legislation includes Acts (Hungarian: törvény or törvények).

List of legislation

Golden Bull of 1222
Golden Bull of 1242
April Laws of 1848
Regency Act (Act XIX of 1937)
Defence Law (Act II of 1938)
Act IV of 1947 on the abolition of certain titles and ranks
Civil Code (Act IV of 1959)
Government decree of 1971 on legal advisers
Act IV of 1972 concerning the courts
Act VII of 1972 on the planning of the national economy
Act I of 1973 on criminal procedure
Act I of 1974 on marriage, family, and guardianship
Act II of 1976 on the protection of human environment
Act I of 1977 on notifications and proposals of public interest, and on complaints
Act VI of 1977 on state enterprises
Act IV of 1978 on criminal code
Act II of 1979 on public finances
Law Decree No 13 of the 1979 on private international law
Code of Civil Procedure

Courts and judiciary

There is a Supreme Court, a Constitutional Court and a Central District Court of Pest. There was a Chief Justice of Hungary.

Legal practitioners

There is a Hungarian Bar Association (Hungarian: Magyar Ügyvédi Kamara). Legislation relating to legal practitioners includes Act XI of 1998.

Criminal law

The law of Hungary includes criminal law. Legislation on this subject has included Act IV of 1978 on criminal code.

Legislation on criminal procedure has included Act III of 1951, Act I of 1973 on criminal procedure and Act XIX of 1998.

Company law
The law of Hungary includes company law. Legislation on accounting has included Act C of 2000.

Energy
The law of Hungary includes energy law. Legislation on electricity has included Act XLVIII of 1994.

History
The royal prerogatives of the King of Hungary included prefection. Tripartitum was a law book.

See also
Hungarian nationality law
Pocket contract

References

Hungary. Guide to Law Online. Law Library of Congress.
Attila Harmathy (ed). Introduction to Hungarian Law. 1st Edition. 1998. 2nd Edition. Kluwer Law International. 2019.
Andras Sajo and Kinga Petervari. "Law & Economics in Hungary". In Boudewijn Bouckaert and Gerrit de Geest. Bibliography of Law and Economics. Springer. Page 591 et seq.
Lajos Nagy. Bibliography of Hungarian Legal Literature, 1945–1965. 1966. Google Books
Martyn Rady. Customary Law in Hungary: Courts, Texts, and the Tripartitum. Oxford University Press. 2015. Google Books
István Werbőczi. János M Bak, Péter Banyó and Martin C Rady (eds). The Customary Law of the Renowned Kingdom of Hungary. Charles Schlacks Jr. 2006. . 
János M Bak. The Laws of the Medieval Kingdom of Hungary. (Decreta Regni Mediaevalis Hungariae). First Edition. Volume 1 (1001-1301). 1989.   Second Edition. Charles Schlacks. Volume 1 (1001-1301). 1999  . Volume 2 (1301-1457) 1992  . Bilingual source.
Vanda Lamm (ed). Transformation in Hungarian Law (1989-2006): Selected Studies. Akadémiai Kiadó. 2007. Google Books
William Sólyom-Fekete. The Legal Effects of a Revolution: Hungary's Legal History, November 1956-November 1958. Law Library of Congress. 1982. Google Books
Márta Dezső and Bernadette Somody. Constitutional Law in Hungary. Kluwer Law International. 2010. Google Books
Elemér Hantos. The Magna Carta of the English and of the Hungarian Constitution. Kegan Paul, Trench, Trubner & Co. London. 1904. Reprinted by the Lawbook Exchange. Clark, New Jersey. 2005. Google Books
András Holló and Árpád Erdei. Selected Decisions of the Constitutional Court of Hungary (1998-2001). Akadémiai Kiadó. 2005. Google Books
Lóránt Csink. The Basic Law of Hungary: A First Commentary. Clarus Press. 2012. .
Attila Menyhárd and Emőd Veress. New Civil Codes in Hungary and Romania. (Ius Gentium: Comparative Perspectives on Law and Justice 63). Springer. 2017. Google Books
Levente Tattay. Intellectual Property Law in Hungary. Kluwer Law International. 2010. Google Books
Miklos K Radvanyi. Press Law in Hungary. Law Library of Congress. 1987. Google Books
Balázs Rátai. Cyber Law in Hungary. Kluwer Law International. 2010. Google Books
Hanna Bokor-Szegö (ed). Questions of International Law: Hungarian Perspectives. Martinus Nijhoff. 1986. Volume 3.
Marcel Szabo, Petra Lea Lancos and Reka Varga. Hungarian Yearbook of International Law and European Law 2014. Eleven International Publishing. 2015. Google Books. See also the other volumes of this series.
Csongor István Nagy. Private International Law in Hungary. Kluwer Law International. 2012. Google Books
József Hajdú. Labour Law in Hungary. Kluwer Law International. 2011. Google Books
Bóka, Gombos, Papp and Pomeisl. Commercial and Economic Law in Hungary. Kluwer Law International. 2019. Google Books
The Commercial Laws of the World. 1911. Volume 28 (Hungary and Croatia-Slavonia).
Edwin Carl Kemp and William Ford Upson. Trading under the Laws of Hungary. United States Bureau of Foreign and Domestic Commerce. 1922. Google Books
Klára Oppenheim and Jenny Power. Hungarian Business Law. Second Revised Edition. Kluwer Law International. 1998. Google Books
Csongor István Nagy. Competition Law in Hungary. Kluwer Law International. 2016. Google Books
Hungary: A Legal Guide. Euromoney Publications. 1999. Google Books
E P Youngman. Mining Laws of Hungary. (Information Circular, volume 6450). United States Department of Commerce, Bureau of Mines. 1931. Google Books
András Nemes. Sports Law in Hungary. Kluwer Law International. 2015. Google Books
Balázs Schanda. Religion and Law in Hungary.  2011. Google Books
Tamás Antal. A Hundred Years of Public Law in Hungary (1890-1990): Studies on the Modern Hungarian Constitution and Legal History. Agapé Doo. Novi Sad. 2012. WorldCat
Viktória Harsági. Evidence in Civil Law - Hungary. Institute for Local Self-Government and Public Procurement Maribor. 2015. . Google Books
Hungarian Law Review. Association of Hungarian Jurists. 1969. 1976. 1981.

Law of Hungary